Arnold Tompkins (1849–1905) was an American educator and university president in the late nineteenth and early twentieth centuries, most known for his work at Illinois State Normal University and Chicago Normal School.

Early life 
Tompkins was born on September 1, 1849 in Edgar County, Illinois. He had brief stints at Indiana University and Butler University before enrolling in and graduating from the Indiana State Normal School in 1880 at the age of 31.

Educator 
Tompkins taught in Worthington, Indiana, from 1880 to 1882, after which he became the superintendent of schools in Franklin, Indiana. In 1885, he went to DePauw University, serving as the head of the English program and working in the normal department. Tompkins moved to the normal school at Terre Haute as an English teacher in 1890, then departed three years later to become a student at the University of Chicago for two years. In 1895, he became a professor of pedagogy at the University of Illinois.

Tompkins published several books related to education and pedagogy, such as A Graded Course of Study for the Franklin Public Schools (1883), The Science of Discourse (1889), The Philosophy of Teaching (1893), and The Philosophy of School Management (1895).

As an educator, Tompkins also traveled all over the United States to give lectures and address educational meetings, garnering himself a national reputation.

University presidencies

Illinois State Normal University 
Tompkins came to ISNU after John W. Cook left to become the president at the Dekalb Normal School in 1899. Under Tompkins, the curriculum at ISNU saw several major changes. There were changes in credit hours, specialized electives offered to students, timelines based on the high school students previously attended, and other minor changes in order to professionalize the curriculum. He also worked to strengthen the faculty and improve the curriculum to better prepare students to become high school teachers.

Chicago Normal School 
In 1900, after ten months, Tompkins left ISNU and became the president of the Chicago Normal School, which today is split into Chicago State University and Northeastern Illinois University. Tompkins said he left the school because the Chicago school would have better facilities and opportunities for him to truly accomplish what he wanted in education. Upon his arrival at the school, Tompkins found a host of issues he had to contend with. There was a surplus of teachers, a long list of incoming cadets, a newly intensified courseload for students, and financial shortages. However, Tompkins did not let this faze him, and continued to work hard to bring the school success.

Death 
Tompkins died on August 14, 1905 in Menlo, Georgia while on vacation from his job at the Chicago Normal School. He was buried in the Alpine Community Church Cemetery in Menlo, Georgia.

References

External links 
 Arnold Tompkins Presidential Papers, 1899-1965
 Biography of Arnold Tompkins at the Illinois State University's Milner Library
 

People from Edgar County, Illinois
Illinois State University alumni
Illinois State University faculty
Writers from Illinois
Chicago State University faculty

1849 births
1905 deaths
Northeastern Illinois University faculty
University of Illinois Urbana-Champaign faculty
Schoolteachers from Indiana
DePauw University faculty
Burials in Georgia (U.S. state)
Heads of universities and colleges in the United States